The Nakajima A1N, or Navy Type 3 Carrier Fighter, was a Japanese carrier-based fighter of the late-1920s and early-1930s. It was a licensed copy of the British Gloster Gambet fighter, built by the Nakajima Aircraft Company for the Imperial Japanese Navy. Approximately 150 were built in two versions, the A1N1 and A1N2.

Development
By 1926, the Imperial Japanese Navy's Mitsubishi 1MF fighters (also known as Type 10 Carrier Fighters) were in need of replacement and so it asked three of the leading Japanese aircraft manufacturers, Nakajima, Mitsubishi and Aichi for proposals for a new carrier-based fighter.

Nakajima purchased a licence from the British Gloster Aircraft Company for production of the Gloster Gambet. It was a private venture design for a carrier-based derivative of their earlier Gloster Gamecock fighter. The prototype Gambet was built by Gloster and first flew on 12 December 1927.

The prototype Gambet was shipped to Japan early in 1928. After modifications were made and it was fitted with a Nakajima-built Bristol Jupiter engine, the Gambet was evaluated by the Japanese navy against competitors from Aichi and Mitsubishi. It proved to be more manoeuvrable while still being a stable gun platform and was selected in April 1929 for production as the Navy Type 3 Carrier Fighter, with the short designation A1N1. 50 A1N1s were built.

The A1N2 used the 336 kW (450 hp) Nakajima Kotobuki 2 engine, and was introduced in 1930. Production of approximately 100 was completed by 1932.

Design
The Gambet was a single-seat, single-bay biplane, of all-wooden construction and powered by an air-cooled Bristol Jupiter radial engine. While similar to the Gamecock, it was fitted with longer-span wings, internal flotation bags and arrestor hooks for carrier operations.

Operational history
The A1N1 entered service in 1929, replacing the Mitsubishi 1-MF. The improved A1N2 entered service in 1930, with production continuing until 1932.

The A1N flew from the carriers Hōshō and Kaga during the Shanghai Incident in 1932 between Japan and China. A1Ns from Kaga scored the Imperial Japanese Navy's first air-to-air combat victory on 22 February 1932 when they shot down a Boeing P-12 (specifically a Model 218, Prototype of the P-12E/F4B-3 variant, after evaluation sold to the Chinese Air Force.) flown by the American volunteer pilot Robert Short. A 15-aircraft formation composed of Mitsubishi B1Ms with A1N escorts attacked Qiaosi Airbase in Hangzhou on 26 February 1932, engaging Chinese fighters in a dogfight, shooting down at least one Junkers K 47.

A1Ns continued in service until 1935, being replaced in service by the Nakajima A2N or Navy Type 90 Carrier Fighter.

Variants
Gloster Gambet
Prototype carrier-based fighter designed and built by Gloster Aircraft Company in the United Kingdom. Powered by one 313 kW (420 hp) Bristol Jupiter VI radial engine, one built.
Nakajima A1N1
Initial licensed production version. Powered by Nakajima built Jupiter VI engine, 50 built between 1928 and 1930.
Nakajima A1N2
Improved production version, powered by 336 kW (450 hp) Nakajima Kotobuki 2 engine. Approximately 100 built between 1930 and 1932.

Operators

Imperial Japanese Navy Air Service

Specifications (A1N2)

See also

References

External links

A1N profiles

A01N
1920s Japanese fighter aircraft
Single-engined tractor aircraft
Biplanes
Carrier-based aircraft
Aircraft first flown in 1927